Lysine (K)-specific demethylase 1B is a protein that in humans is encoded by the KDM1B gene.

Function 

Flavin-dependent histone demethylases, such as KDM1B, regulate histone lysine methylation, an epigenetic mark that regulates gene expression and chromatin function.

References

Further reading